Brother Andre High School is a Catholic Secondary High School located at West Badaripur, Sonapur, Noakhali Sadar Noakhali, Bangladesh.

It is named after Saint Andre Bessette (also known as Brother Andre) a 20th-century Catholic brother in Montreal, responsible for the construction of the Saint Joseph's Oratory.

Established in 1939 as Brother Andre High School in Noakhali by the Congregation of Holy Cross Missionaries the institution has a general certificate of education based education structure. After the Liberation war of Bangladesh, the medium of instruction changed to Bangladeshi. The institution is monitored from the United States of America to maintain its reputation. This is a combined school including two sections of boys and girls.

The school has three play-grounds for football (soccer) and cricket. Brother Andre High School is run under the supervision of the Roman Catholic Archdiocese of Dhaka.

References

Holy Cross secondary schools
Congregation of Holy Cross
Schools in Noakhali District
1939 establishments in India